In transplantation, autologous lymphocytes refers to a person's own white blood cells.  Lymphocytes have a number of roles in the immune system, including the production of antibodies and other substances that fight infections and other diseases.

References
 National Cancer Institute Definition of autologous lymphocyte
 NCI: autologous lymphocyte

Transplantation medicine